Roxy Earle (born August 3, 1983) is a Canadian reality television personality, entrepreneur, and business executive. Earle is the founder of the Luxurious Roxy lifestyle brand  and is most well known for being a star of the reality television series, The Real Housewives of Toronto.

Early life and education
Earle was born and raised in Toronto, Ontario. She first attended Etobicoke School of the Arts in Toronto, majoring in theatre at the school. Earle then attended Wilfrid Laurier University, graduating from the school with a degree in business and communications.

Career
After graduating from university, Earle worked as an account executive at ad agency, Ogilvy & Mather for five years. Following this, while still at Ogilvy & Mather, Earle worked in London as the Global Account Director for the agency’s American Express account, where she managed the Europe, Middle East and Africa region for American Express.   After returning to Toronto, Earle became the manager of advertising and sponsorship for American Express Canada.

In 2021, Roxy co-founded the mental wellness and women's health app, Ana. Ana provides mindset practices and informational tools to support women through journeys in women's health, mental health, work life, and self-love. Ana has been featured by various media outlets, notably being featured in the Vancouver Sun "It List" in 2022.

Lifestyle brand and body positive activism

Earle runs a lifestyle brand that she founded called Luxurious Roxy. She also served as the Collaborating Creative Director of the Roxy Earle x Le Château, a fashion line made in partnership with Canadian retailer Le Château, which caters to women from size 0-22W. Earle’s line with Le Château launched in Toronto in June 2018 and included more than 40 clothing designs and 18 accessory styles. She is the first person to include sizes 0-22 in Canadian retail stores. Earle’s clothes have been worn by stars like Lena Dunham and Chrissy Metz. Earle also launched a swimwear line in collaboration with body positive intimates company Knix, featuring a photoshoot with Earle and several other body positive influencers.

In 2019, Earle was given a Visionary Award by Fashion Group International Toronto for her work in empowering women. She also started the hashtag #MySizeRox and partnered with Instagram to speak about body image.

References 

1983 births
Living people
Businesspeople from Toronto
Canadian business executives
Participants in Canadian reality television series